The East Tennessee State Buccaneers men's basketball team represents East Tennessee State University (ETSU), located in Johnson City, Tennessee, in men's college basketball.  East Tennessee State is coached by Desmond Oliver and currently competes in the Southern Conference. The team last played in the NCAA Division I men's basketball tournament in 2017. In March 2020 the Buccaneers won the SoCon championship.

History

Conference affiliations 
 Pre-1958 – Volunteer State Athletic Conference
 1958–59 to 1977–78 – Ohio Valley Conference
 1979–80 to 2004–05 – Southern Conference
 2005–06 to 2013–14 – Atlantic Sun Conference
 2014–15 to present – Southern Conference

Notes

Season-by-season results

The Les Robinson / Alan LeForce era

Commonly referred to as "The Glory Days" of ETSU basketball, between 1989 and 1992, ETSU won 4 straight Southern Conference titles while compiling 99 wins. During this 4-year period ETSU had wins over prestigious programs such as Arizona, NC State (3 times), Wake Forest, Cincinnati, BYU, Xavier, Mississippi State, Southern Miss, Tennessee (twice) and Memphis. ETSU also suffered their most famous loss when they lost by 1 point to top ranked Oklahoma as a 16th seed in the 1989 NCAA tournament.

When Les Robinson left for NC State after the 1990 season, longtime assistant Alan Leforce took over a veteran team led by Senior Keith "Mister" Jennings. The team was ranked as high as 10th in the nation during the 1991 season and finished the year 17th in the AP poll and 15th in the Coaches poll. In the 1992 NCAA tournament ETSU upset the Arizona Wildcats in the opening round, but eventually fell in the second round to the Michigan Wolverines and the Fab Five.

The Buccaneers went into steep decline after that, bottoming out with a 7–20 record in 1995-96. LeForce resigned after the season.

The Ed Dechellis era

In 1996 Ed Dechellis replaced Alan Leforce who resigned after the 1995–1996 season. In 2001 Dechellis led ETSU to their first regular season conference title since the 91–92 season. In 2003 Dechellis helped ETSU win their first Southern Conference Tournament title and first NCAA berth since 1992. ETSU faced Wake Forest University in the first round where they lost in the final seconds 73–76 after having a chance to win the game with the last shot. After the 2003 season Dechellis left for Penn State.

Dechellis complied 105–93 record at ETSU but is mostly remembered for bringing prominence back to the ETSU basketball program that had struggled after the 1993 season.

The Murry Bartow era
In 2003 ETSU hired Murry Bartow after Ed Dechellis took the head coaching position at Penn State. Bartow took over a senior led team that won 27 games and nearly went undefeated in conference play in his first season; additionally, ETSU won their second straight Southern Conference Tournament and headed back to the NCAA tournament for the second straight year. ETSU had another close call in the 2004 NCAA tournament when they lost to Cincinnati 77–80 in the closing seconds, much like the Wake Forest game the previous year.

In the 2005–2006 season ETSU left the Southern Conference to join the Atlantic Sun Conference after the school dropped football. During his time in the Atlantic Sun ETSU has received 4 postseason bids. Back to Back NCAA tournaments in 2009 and 2010, the NIT in 2007 and the CIT in 2011.  The Buccaneers rejoined the Southern Conference as part of reinstating football in 2016.  After 12 years, an overall record of 224–169 (with a record of 16–14, 8–10 in SoCon play in the 2014–15 season), and three NCAA appearances at East Tennessee State, Bartow was fired due a five-season tournament drought with declining team performance.

The Steve Forbes era
After Murry Bartow was fired, Steve Forbes became the 16th head coach in ETSU's 95-year history on March 30, 2015. He served two seasons as an assistant coach at Wichita State Shockers men's basketball where he helped take the Shockers to the Sweet 16 the past season before taking the ETSU job. Forbes' recruiting ties and his extensive background as an assistant coach at the NCAA Division I level – which included a five-year stop at the University of Tennessee – made him a perfect fit for ETSU, according to ETSU Director of Intercollegiate Athletics Dr. Richard Sander. In five seasons at ETSU, Forbes tallied at least 24 wins each year.  The 2017 team shared the Southern Conference regular season title and won the Southern Conference Tournament in Asheville to represent the league in the NCAA tournament.  Forbes led the team to another conference regular season championship in 2019-20 and a school record 30 wins. On April 30, 2020, Forbes left ETSU to accept the head coaching job at Wake Forest.

Jason Shay
On May 7, 2020, a week after Forbes departed for Wake Forest, ETSU assistant coach Jason Shay was named the 17th head coach of the program. In the 2020-21 season, Shay led the Buccaneers to a 13-12 overall record and an appearance in the semifinals of the 2021 Southern Conference Tournament. On March 30, 2021, Shay decided to resign after one season as head coach.

The Desmond Oliver era
Six days after Jason Shay resigned, University of Tennessee assistant coach Desmond Oliver was named the 18th head coach of the program on April 5, 2021.

Desmond Oliver was let go on March 10, 2023. Dr. Richard Sander, ETSU's Athletic Director, stated “I met with Coach Oliver today, and we discussed the program is not meeting the expectations of the Athletics Department. We feel that parting ways is the best thing for our men’s basketball program and our student-athletes. We wish Coach Oliver the best in his future endeavors.”

Oliver had finished the second year of a five-year contract, the first 20-loss season for ETSU in a decade.

The Brooks Savage era
Following the firing of Desmond Oliver, Brooks Savage was named the 19th head coach of ETSU men’s basketball on March 20, 2023.

Postseason

NCAA Division I tournament results
The Buccaneers have appeared in the NCAA Division I Tournament ten times. Their combined record is 2–11. They also qualified for the 2020 NCAA tournament, which was canceled due to the COVID-19 pandemic.

NCAA Division II tournament results
The Buccaneers have appeared in the NCAA Division II Tournament one time. Their record is 1–1.

NAIA tournament results
The Buccaneers have appeared in the NAIA Tournament three times. Their combined record is 0–3.

NIT results
The Buccaneers have appeared in the National Invitation Tournament (NIT) two times. Their combined record is 0–2.

Vegas 16 results
The Buccaneers have appeared in the Vegas 16 one time. Their record is 1–1.

CIT results
The Buccaneers have appeared in the CollegeInsider.com Postseason Tournament (CIT) three times. Their combined record is 3–3.

Team records

Career leaders

Single game leaders 

All stats are from the 2010–2011 media guide and are updated through the 2010–2011 basketball season.

Record home crowds
Top 8 all-time home crowds to attend an ETSU basketball game in Johnson City.

ETSU players in the NBA and ABA
3 players from ETSU have played in the NBA & ABA  and a total of 8 players have been drafted.

References

External links